The Messiah in Judaism is a savior and liberator figure in Jewish eschatology, who is believed to be the future redeemer of the Jewish people. The concept of messianism originated in Judaism, and in the Hebrew Bible a messiah is a king or High Priest of Israel traditionally anointed with holy anointing oil. However, messiahs were not exclusively Jewish, as the Hebrew Bible refers to Cyrus the Great, king of the first Persian empire, as a messiah for his decree to rebuild the Jerusalem Temple.

In Jewish eschatology, the Messiah is a future Jewish king from the Davidic line, who is expected to be anointed with holy anointing oil and rule the Jewish people during the Messianic Age and world to come.

Jewish messianism gave birth to Christianity, which started as a Second Temple period messianic Jewish sect or religious movement.

Etymology
In Jewish eschatology, the term mashiach, or "Messiah", refers specifically to a future Jewish king from the Davidic line, who is expected to save the Jewish nation, and will be anointed with holy anointing oil and rule the Jewish people during the Messianic Age. In a generalized sense, messiah has "the connotation of a savior or redeemer who would appear at the end of days and usher in the kingdom of God, the restoration of Israel, or whatever dispensation was considered to be the ideal state of the world."

Messianism "denotes a movement, or a system of beliefs and ideas, centered on the expectation of the advent of a messiah." Orthodox views hold that the Messiah will be descended from his father through the line of King David, and will gather the Jews back into the Land of Israel, usher in an era of peace, build the Third Temple, father a male heir, re-institute the Sanhedrin, and so on. The word, mashiach, however, is rarely used in Jewish literature within the 1st century BCE and the 1st century CE.

Jewish tradition of the late, or early post-Second Temple period alludes to two redeemers, one suffering and the second fulfilling the traditional messianic role, namely Mashiach ben Yosef, and Mashiach ben David. In general, the term "Messiah" unqualified refers to "Mashiach ben David" (Messiah, son of David).

Belief in the future advent of the Messiah was originally a fringe idea, but somewhat controversially, according to Maimonides is one of the fundamental requisites of the Jewish faith, concerning which  has written: "Anyone who does not believe in him, or who does not wait for his arrival, has not merely denied the other prophets, but has also denied the Torah and Moses, our Rabbi."

Origins and history

Pre-exile Jewish eschatology (8th–6th cent. BCE)

The roots of Jewish eschatology are to be found in the pre-exile prophets, including Isaiah and Jeremiah, and the exile prophets Ezekiel and Deutero-Isaiah. The main tenets of Jewish eschatology are the following, in no particular order, elaborated in the books of Isaiah, Jeremiah and Ezekiel:
 End of world (before everything as follows).
 God redeems the Jewish people from the captivity that began during the Babylonian Exile, in a new Exodus
 God returns the Jewish people to the Land of Israel
 God restores the House of David and the Temple in Jerusalem
 God creates a regent from the House of David (i.e. the Jewish Messiah) to lead the Jewish people and the world and usher in an age of justice and peace
 All nations recognize that the God of Israel is the only true God
 God resurrects the dead
 God creates a new heaven and a new earth

Second Temple period (516 BCE–70 CE)

Early in the Second Temple period hopes for a better future are described in the Jewish scriptures. After the return from the Babylonian exile, the Persian king Cyrus the Great was called "messiah" in Isaiah, due to his role in the return of the Jewish exiles.

A number of messianic ideas developed during the later Second Temple period, ranging from this-worldly, political expectations, to apocalyptic expectations of an endtime in which the dead would be resurrected and the Kingdom of Heaven would be established on earth. The Messiah might be a kingly "Son of David," or a more heavenly "Son of Man", but "Messianism became increasingly eschatological, and eschatology was decisively influenced by apocalypticism", while "messianic expectations became increasingly focused on the figure of an individual savior." According to Zwi Werblowsky, "the Messiah no longer symbolized the coming of the new age, but he was somehow supposed to bring it about." The "Lord's anointed" thus became the "savior and redeemer" and the focus of more intense expectations and doctrines." Messianic ideas developed both by new interpretations (pesher, midrash) of the Jewish scriptures, but also by visionary revelations.

Apocalypticism

Messiah in apocalypticism

Religious views on whether Hebrew Bible passages refer to a Messiah may vary among scholars of ancient Israel, looking at their meaning in their original contexts, and among rabbinical scholars. The reading of messianic attestations in passages from Isaiah, Jeremiah and Ezekiel is anachronistic, because messianism developed later than these texts. According to James C. VanderKam, there are no Jewish texts before the 2nd century BCE which mention a messianic leader, though some terms point in this direction, and some terms, such as the suffering servant from Isaiah, were later interpreted as such.

According to Zwi Werblowsky, the brutal regime of Hellenistic Greek Seleucid king Antiochus IV (r. 175–163 BCE) led to renewed messianic expectations, as reflected in the Book of Daniel. His rule was ended by the Maccabean Revolt (167-160 BCE), and the installment of the Hasmonean dynasty (167-37 BCE). The Maccabees ruled Judea semi-independently from the Seleucid Empire from 167-110 BCE, fully independently from 110-63 BCE, and as a Roman client state from 63-37 BCE, when Herod the Great came to power. With the end of the Hasmonean dynasty, the belief in a messianic leader further developed. According to James C. VanderKam, the apocalyptic genre shows a negative attitude towards the foreign powers which ruled Judea, but rejection of these powers was not the only cause of the development of the apocalyptic genre.

According to VanderKam, "the vast majority of Second Temple texts have no reference to a messianic leader of the endtime." The Animal Apocalypse (c. 160 BCE) is the first to do so, but after that time, only some apocalypses, and some texts which are not apocalypses but do contain apocalyptic or eschatological teachings, refer to a messianic leader. According to VanderKam, the lack of messianic allusions may be explained by the fact that Judea was governed for centuries by foreign powers, often without great problems, or a negative stance by Jews toward these Gentile powers.

In the first millennium BCE, in the Qumran texts, the Psalms of Solomon, and the Similitudes of Enoch, "both foreign and native rulers are castigated and hopes are placed on a Messiah (or Messiahs) who will end the present evil age of injustice. After the First Jewish–Roman War (66-70 CE), texts like 2 Baruch and 4 Ezra reflect the despair of the time. The images and status of the messiah in the various texts are quite different, but the apocalyptic messiahs are only somewhat more exalted than the leaders portrayed in the non-apocalyptic texts.

Charleswoth notes that messianic concepts are found in the Old Testament pseudepigrapha, which include a large number of Apocalypses.

Book of Daniel

The Book of Daniel (mid-2nd c. BCE) was quoted and referenced by both Jews and Christians in the 1st century CE as predicting the imminent end-time. The concepts of immortality and resurrection, with rewards for the righteous and punishment for the wicked, have roots much deeper than Daniel, but the first clear statement is found in the final chapter of that book: "Many of those who sleep in the dust of the earth shall awake, some to everlasting life, and some to everlasting shame and contempt." Without this belief, Christianity, in which the resurrection of Jesus plays a central role, may have disappeared, like the movements following other charismatic Jewish figures of the 1st century.

1 Enoch

The Book of Enoch (1 Enoch, 3rd-1st c. BCE) is an ancient Jewish apocalyptic religious work, ascribed by tradition to Enoch, the great-grandfather of Noah. Enoch contains a prophetic exposition of the thousand-year reign of the Messiah. The older sections (mainly in the Book of the Watchers) of the text are estimated to date from about 300 BCE, while the latest part (Book of Parables) probably to the 1st century BCE.

1 Enoch is the first text to contain the idea of a preexistent heavenly Messiah, called the "Son of Man." 1 Enoch, and also 4 Ezra, transform the expectation of a kingly Messiah of Daniel 7 into "an exalted, heavenly messiah whose role would be to execute judgment and to inaugurate a new age of peace and rejoicing." He is described as an angelic being, who "was chosen and hidden with God before the world was created, and will remain in His presence forevermore." He is the embodiment of justice and Wisdom, seated on a throne in Heaven, who will be revealed to the world at the end of times, when he will judge all beings.

Some scholars contend that 1 Enoch was influential in molding New Testament doctrines about the Messiah, the Son of Man, the messianic kingdom, Christian demonology, the resurrection, and Christian eschatology.

Messianic titles of the Dead Sea Scrolls
VanderKam further notes that a variety of titles are being used for the Messiah(s) in the Dead Sea Scrolls:
 Messiah - the Damascus Document, the Rule of the Congregation, the Commentary on Genesis, 4Q521 (Messianic Apocalypse), possibly 4Q246 ("Son of God Text")
 Righteous One
 Chosen One
 Son of Man
 Son (of God)
 God's Servant
 Prince of the Congregation 
 Branch of David
 Interpreter of the Law
 (High) Priest

Messianic allusions

Messianic allusions to some figures include to Menahem ben Hezekiah who traditionally was born on the same day that the Second Temple was destroyed.

Jesus

Jewish Christianity

Christianity started as a messianic Jewish sect. Most of Jesus's teachings were intelligible and acceptable in terms of Second Temple Judaism; what set the followers of Jesus apart from other Jews was their faith in Jesus as the resurrected messiah. While ancient Judaism acknowledged multiple messiahs, the two most relevant being the Messiah ben Joseph and the traditional Messiah ben David, Christianity acknowledges only one ultimate Messiah. Jesus would have been viewed by many as one or both. According to Larry Hurtado, "the christology and devotional stance that Paul affirmed (and shared with others in the early Jesus-movement) was not a departure from or a transcending of a supposedly monochrome Jewish messianism, but, instead, a distinctive expression within a variegated body of Jewish messianic hopes."

Rejection of Jesus as the Messiah

According to Maimonides, Jesus was the most influential, and consequently, the most damaging of all false messiahs. However, since the traditional Jewish belief is that the messiah has not yet come and the Messianic Age is not yet present, the total rejection of Jesus as either messiah or deity has never been a central issue for Judaism.

Judaism has never accepted any of the claimed fulfillments of prophecy that Christianity attributes to Jesus. Judaism forbids the worship of a person as a form of idolatry, since the central belief of Judaism is the absolute unity and singularity of God. Jewish eschatology holds that the coming of the Messiah will be associated with a specific series of events that have not yet occurred, including the return of Jews to their homeland and the rebuilding of The Temple, a Messianic Age of peace and understanding during which "the knowledge of God" fills the earth." And since Jews believe that none of these events occurred during the lifetime of Jesus (nor have they occurred afterwards), he was not the Messiah.

Traditional views of Jesus have been mostly negative (see Toledot Yeshu, an account that portrays Jesus as an impostor), although in the Middle Ages Judah Halevi and Maimonides viewed Jesus as an important preparatory figure for a future universal ethical monotheism of the Messianic Age. Some modern Jewish thinkers, starting in the 18th century with the Orthodox Jacob Emden and the reformer Moses Mendelssohn, have sympathetically argued that the historical Jesus may have been closer to Judaism than either the Gospels or traditional Jewish accounts would indicate.

Post-Temple and medieval views

Talmud
The Talmud extensively discusses the coming of the Messiah (Sanhedrin 98a–99a, et al.) and describes a period of freedom and peace, which will be the time of ultimate goodness for the Jews. Tractate Sanhedrin contains a long discussion of the events leading to the coming of the Messiah. The Talmud tells many stories about the Messiah, some of which represent famous Talmudic rabbis as receiving personal visitations from Elijah the Prophet and the Messiah.

Midrash
There are innumerable references to the Messiah in Midrashic literature, where they often stretch the meaning of biblical verses. One such reference is found in the Midrash HaGadol (on Genesis 36:39) where Abba bar Kahana says: "What is meant by, 'In that day the root of Jesse, who shall stand as an ensign for the peoples, of him shall the nations inquire, and his rest shall be glorious' (Isaiah 11:10)? It means that when the banner of the anointed king shall be lifted-up, all the masts of ships belonging to the nations of the world shall be broken, while all the lines (halyard, downhaul and sheets) are cut loose, while all ships are broken asunder, and none of them remain excepting the banner of the son of David, as it says: 'who shall stand as an ensign for the peoples'.  Likewise, when the banner of the son of David shall arise, all the languages belonging to the nations shall be made useless, and their customs shall be rendered null and void. The nations, at that time, will learn from the Messiah, as it says: 'of him shall the nations inquire' (ibid.); 'and his rest shall be glorious', meaning, he gives to them satisfaction, and tranquility, and they dwell in peace and quiet."

Maimonides
The influential Jewish philosopher Maimonides discussed the messiah in his Mishneh Torah, his 14-volume compendium of Jewish law, in the section Hilkhot Melakhim Umilchamoteihem, chapters 11 & 12. According to Maimonides, Jesus of Nazareth is not the Messiah, as is claimed by Christians.

Spanish Inquisition 
Following the expulsion of Jews from Spain in 1492, many Spanish rabbis such as Abraham ben Eliezer Halevi believed that the year 1524 would be the beginning of the Messianic Age and that the Messiah himself would appear in 1530–31.

Contemporary Jewish views

Orthodox Judaism
Orthodox Judaism maintains the 13 Principles of Faith as formulated by Maimonides in his introduction to Chapter Helek of the Mishna Torah. Each principle starts with the words Ani Maamin (I believe). Number 12 is the main principle relating to Mashiach. 
Orthodox Jews strictly believe in a Messiah, life after death, and restoration of the Promised Land:

Hasidic Judaism
Hasidic Jews tend to have a particularly strong and passionate belief in the immediacy of the Messiah's coming, and in the ability of their actions to hasten his arrival. Because of the supposed piousness, wisdom, and leadership abilities of the Hasidic Masters, members of Hasidic communities are sometimes inclined to regard their dynastic rebbes as potential candidates for Messiah. Many Jews (see the Bartenura's explanation on Megillat Rut, and the Halakhic responsa of The Ch'sam Sofer on Choshen Mishpat [vol. 6], Chapter 98 where this view is explicit), especially Hasidim, adhere to the belief that there is a person born each generation with the potential to become Messiah, if the Jewish people warrant his coming; this candidate is known as the Tzadik Ha-Dor, meaning Tzaddik of the Generation. However, fewer are likely to name a candidate.

Chabad messianism

Rabbi Menachem Mendel Schneerson, the last Rebbe of Chabad-Lubavitch, declared often that the Messiah is very close, urging all to pray for the coming of the Messiah and to do everything possible to hasten the coming of the Messiah through increased acts of kindness. Starting in the late 1960s, the Rebbe called for his followers to become involved in outreach activities with the purpose of bringing about the Jewish Messianic Age, which led to controversy surrounding the messianic beliefs of Chabad. Some Chabad Hasidim, called mashichists, "have not yet accepted the Rebbe's passing" and even after his death regard him as the (living) 'King Messiah' and 'Moses of the generation', awaiting his second coming.

The "Chabad-Messianic question", regarding a dead Messiah, got oppositional addresses from a halachic perspective by many prominent Orthodox authorities, including leaders from the Ashkenazi non-Hasidic Lithuanian (Litvak) institutions, Ponevezh yeshiva in Bnei Brak, Israel, and got vehement opposition, notably that of the Yeshivas Chofetz Chaim (RSA) in New York and that of the Rabbinical Council of America.

Conservative Judaism
Emet Ve-Emunah, the Conservative movement's statement of principles, states the following:

Reform and Reconstructionist Judaism
Reform Judaism and Reconstructionist Judaism generally do not accept the idea that there will be a Messiah. Some believe that there may be some sort of Messianic Age (the World to Come) in the sense of a utopia, which all Jews are obligated to work towards (thus the tradition of Tikkun olam). In 1999, the Central Conference of American Rabbis, the official body of American Reform rabbis, authored "A Statement of Principles for Reform Judaism", meant to describe and define the spiritual state of modern Reform Judaism.

Calculation of appearance
According to the Talmud, the Midrash, and the Zohar, the 'deadline' by which the Messiah must appear is 6000 years from creation (approximately the year 2240 in the Gregorian calendar, though calculations vary). Elaborating on this theme are numerous early and late Jewish scholars, including the Ramban, Isaac Abrabanel, Abraham Ibn Ezra, Rabbeinu Bachya, the Vilna Gaon, the Lubavitcher Rebbe, the Ramchal, Aryeh Kaplan, and Rebbetzin Esther Jungreis.

See also
 Armilus
 Old Testament messianic prophecies quoted in the New Testament
 List of Jewish messiah claimants
 Year 6000

Notes

References

Sources
Printed sources

 

 

 
 
 

 

 
 

 
 

 
 

 

Web-sources

Further reading
 Emet Ve-Emunah: Statement of Principles of Conservative Judaism, Ed. Robert Gordis, Jewish Theological Seminary of America, 1988
 
 Mashiach Rabbi Jacob Immanuel Schochet, published by S.I.E., Brooklyn, NY, 1992 ; LCCN 92090728 (also available in Spanish, Portuguese, Italian, French, Persian, Hebrew, and Braille translations)
 Miriam Naomi Mashiah
 Mishneh Torah, Maimonides, Chapter on Hilkhot Melakhim Umilchamoteihem (Laws of Kings and Wars)
 Moses Maimonides's Treatise on Resurrection, Trans. Fred Rosner
 Philosophies of Judaism by Julius Guttmann, trans. by David Silverman, JPS. 1964
 Reform Judaism: A Centenary Perspective, Central Conference of American Rabbis

External links
 Jewish Encyclopedia: Messiah
 Moshiach and the Future Redemption
 Who is the Messiah? by Jeffrey A. Spitzer
 Why did the majority of the Jewish world reject Jesus as the Messiah, and why did the first Christians accept Jesus as the Messiah? by Rabbi Shraga Simmons
 The Messiah, by the University of Calgary
 Videos on Topic of Moshiach by Jewish Rabbis